The 2014 United States Senate special election in South Carolina took place on November 4, 2014, concurrently with the regular election for the other South Carolina Senate seat. The special-election Senate seat was formerly held by Republican Jim DeMint, who resigned on January 1, 2013, to become president of the Heritage Foundation.

Nikki Haley, the Republican Governor of South Carolina, announced the appointment of U.S. Representative Tim Scott to fill the seat. Scott ran in the special election and won by beating Democratic candidate and Richland County councilwoman Joyce Dickerson in the November election.

The election was noted for being the second U.S. Senate election since the passage of the Seventeenth Amendment and the first in a former Confederate state where both major party nominees were black.

Background 
On December 6, 2012, Senator Jim DeMint announced his intention to resign effective January 1, 2013, to become the president of The Heritage Foundation, a conservative think tank.

Nikki Haley, the Governor of South Carolina, appointed a replacement to fill the seat until the special election.  Haley indicated that she would not appoint a "placeholder" to the seat, but would appoint someone who would stand in a 2014 special election to serve the remaining two years of DeMint's term. On December 17, 2012, Haley announced that she would appoint Scott to DeMint's seat following his resignation.

Senate replacement process 

According to sources close to Governor Haley, as of December 11, 2012, she had narrowed the list of potential appointees down to five:

 Tim Scott, U.S. Representative (SC-01) 
 Trey Gowdy, U.S. Representative (SC-04)
 Henry McMaster, former South Carolina Attorney General,
 Jenny Sanford, former First Lady of South Carolina
 Catherine Templeton, head of the South Carolina Department of Health and Environmental Control.

Other politicians mentioned as possible replacements for DeMint included U.S. Representatives Mick Mulvaney and Joe Wilson, former U.S. Representative Gresham Barrett state representative Nathan Ballentine, South Carolina Attorney General Alan Wilson, former Ambassador to Canada David Wilkins, former South Carolina Republican Party chair Katon Dawson, and Haley's deputy chief of staff Tedd Pitts.

Liberal comedian Stephen Colbert, a South Carolina native, expressed interest in being appointed the seat, asking his fans to tweet Haley that she should appoint him. Chad Walldorf, the owner of the Sticky Fingers restaurant chain, had also been mentioned as a potential placeholder.

Polling on DeMint's replacement 
A Public Policy Polling poll released on December 10, 2012, which asked respondents who they wanted to replace DeMint, showed Colbert with the highest total. Colbert had support at 20 percent, followed by Scott at 15 percent, Gowdy at 14 percent, and Sanford at 11 percent. Haley said that she would not appoint Colbert to the seat.

Republican primary

Candidates

Declared 
 Tim Scott, incumbent U.S. Senator
 Randall Young

Results

Democratic primary

Candidates

Declared 
 Joyce Dickerson, Richland County Councilwoman and former chair of the National Foundation for Women Legislators
 Sidney Moore, former York County Councilman
 Harry Pavilack, attorney and candidate for South Carolina's 7th congressional district in 2012

Withdrew 
 Rick Wade, former United States Department of Commerce official and nominee for Secretary of State of South Carolina in 2002

Declined 
 Jim Hodges, former governor of South Carolina
 John L. Scott, Jr., state senator
 James E. Smith, Jr., state representative (running for re-election)
 Leon Stavrinakis, state representative (running for re-election)

Polling

Results

Independent and third parties

Candidates

Declared 
 Jill Bossi (American Party), vice president of the American Red Cross

Removed from ballot 
 Brandon Armstrong (Independent), businesswoman

General election

Debates 
 Complete video of debate, October 28, 2014

Endorsements

Predictions

Polling

Results

See also 

 2014 United States Senate election in South Carolina
 2014 United States House of Representatives elections in South Carolina
 2014 South Carolina gubernatorial election
 2014 United States Senate elections
 2014 United States elections

References

Notes

External links 
 U.S. Senate special election in South_Carolina, 2014 at Ballotpedia
Official campaign websites (Archived)
 Tim Scott for U.S. Senate
 Jill Bossi for U.S. Senate
 Joyce Dickerson for U.S. Senate

South Carolina 2014
South Carolina 2014
2014 Special
South Carolina Special
United States Senate Special
United States Senate 2014